Olimpia Basketball Club, commonly known as Olimpia de Venado Tuerto (abbreviated Olimpia BBC) is an Argentine professional basketball club, that is based in the city of Venado Tuerto, Santa Fe Province.

History 
The club was established on August 26, 1940, in Barrio San Martín of Venado Tuerto. In 1991, the team was promoted to  the top-tier level Argentine League (LNB). In the 1994–95 season, Olimpia reached the Argentine League finals, where they were beaten by Club Sportivo Independiente. 

Olimpia won its first Argentine LNB title in the 1995–96 season. The roster for that season was: Alejandro Montecchia, Walter Guiñazú, Federico Helale, Jorge Racca, Leonardo Gutiérrez, Lucas Victoriano, Sebastián Uranga, Todd Jadlow, Andrés Rodríguez, Carlos López Jordan, Alejandro Burgos, and Michael Lamont Wilson. The team's head coach was Horacio Seguí, while Jorge Racca was named the Argentine League MVP. That same year, Olimpia also won the FIBA South American League, after defeating the Brazilian Championship team S.C. Corinthians Paulista, in the final. Jorge Racca was also the MVP of that competition. The club also competed at the 1996 edition of the FIBA Intercontinental Cup.

Nevertheless, the club then entered into a crisis, due to financial problems. By 2009, Olimpia had a debt of $1.5 million, and due to that critical situation, the basketball team disaffiliated itself from the top level Argentine League. The club was still in bankruptcy until 2017, when it finally cleared its debts.

Honours

Domestic 
 Liga Nacional 
 Winners (1): 1995–96
 Runners-up (1): 1994–95

International 
 Liga Sudamericana 
 Winners (1): 1996
 Campeonato Panamericano 
 Runners-up (1): 1994
 Campeonato Sudamericano 
 Runners-up (1): 1994
 FIBA Intercontinental Cup 
 Runners-up (1): 1996

Notable players 

 Héctor Campana (1993–95)
 Carlos Delfino (1998–99)
 Leonardo Gutiérrez (1993–98)
 Wálter Herrmann (1996–2000)
 Alejandro Montecchia (1994–98)
 Andrés Nocioni (1996–97)
 Esteban Pérez (1999–2000)
 Jorge Racca (1994–97, 2007)
 Selem Safar (2005–2006)
 Sebastián Uranga (1994–97, 1998–99)
 Lucas Victoriano (1995–97)
 Pat Durham (1992–93)
 Todd Jadlow
 Levy Middlebrooks (2000)
 Michael Lamont Wilson

Head coaches
 Horacio Seguí

References

External links
 Twitter page

Basketball teams in Argentina
Basketball teams established in 1940